György Budaházy (born June 3, 1969 Budapest) is a Hungarian nationalist political figure and convicted domestic terrorist.

Public life
He founded in 2006, together with László Toroczkai the Hunnia organization. This rejects both the accession of Hungary to the European Union in 2004 and the Treaty of Trianon and calls for a Greater Hungary in the borders before 1920.

After primary school and high school György Budaházy studied engineering, graduated from the studies in 1992. He then started a small business. At that time, he joined the Hungarian Democratic Forum (MDF).

Budaházy was known with his new organization by numerous acts of violence with Molotov cocktails. Budaházy was imprisoned in custody for various militant offenses since 2009.

Family
In 1997, he married Bernadett Trencsányi, with whom he has three children (born 1999, 2001 and 2006). His younger sister Edda Budaházy is a well-known right-wing activist, too.

He was born into an old noble family (Budaházy de Budaháza et Veskócz). One of his ancestors, István Budaházy was mentioned by Géza Gárdonyi in his novel, Eclipse of the Crescent Moon, who participated in the Siege of Eger in 1552 and seriously injured. Another ancestor, János XIV Budaházy (1652–1678) was a young Kuruc cavalry officer. After the losing Battle of Györke (1672) he spent the rest of his life in exile.

References

Further reading
Budaházy family
 Veskóczi Budaházy családi krónika, Hajdúsámson, 2000.
 Egy család évszázadai. A budaházi és veskóczy Budaházy család története. Genealogiai táblázatok az 1260-as évektől napjainkig. Budaházi Családi Alapítvány, Debrecen, 2004,

External links
Budaházy György honlapja
Budaházy György választási honlapja
Budaházyval kapcsolatos írások
Budaházy műsorának archívuma
Budaházy műsorának társalgó témája
Dr Gaudi Nagy Tamás honlapja

1969 births
Hungarian Democratic Forum politicians
Hungarian nationalists
Living people